Clathrozoidae is a family of cnidarians belonging to the order Leptomedusae.

Genera:
 Clathrozoon Spencer, 1891
 Pseudoclathrozoon Hirohito, 1967

References

Leptothecata
Cnidarian families